Anna Morgan may refer to:

People
 Anna Morgan (teacher) (1851-1936), American drama teacher from Chicago
 Ann Haven Morgan (born "Anna" 1882–1966), American zoologist and ecologist

Fictional characters
 Anna Morgan, character in The Ring (2002 film)
 Anna Morgan, character in Voyage in the Dark
 Anna Morgan, character in Anna's Dream

See also
Ann Morgan (disambiguation)
Anne Morgan (disambiguation)